The 2022 Open de Rennes was a professional tennis tournament played on hard courts. It was the sixteenth edition of the tournament and part of the 2022 ATP Challenger Tour. It took place in Rennes, France between 12 and 18 September 2022.

Singles main-draw entrants

Seeds

1 Rankings are as of 29 August 2022.

Other entrants
The following players received wildcards into the singles main draw:
  Clément Chidekh
  Gabriel Debru
  Dominic Thiem

The following players received entry from the qualifying draw:
  Filip Bergevi
  Karl Friberg
  Yannick Mertens
  Maxime Mora
  Max Hans Rehberg
  Marko Topo

Champions

Singles

 Ugo Humbert def.  Dominic Thiem 6–3, 6–0.

Doubles

 Jonathan Eysseric /  David Pel def.  Dan Added /  Albano Olivetti 6–4, 6–4.

References

2022
2022 ATP Challenger Tour
2022 in French tennis
September 2022 sports events in France